Two submarines of Germany have borne the name UC-2:

, a Type UC I submarine both launched and lost in 1915
UC-2, formerly the B-class submarine  captured from Norway in 1940

See also
 German Type UC II submarine

German Navy ship names